Théo Bouchlarhem (born 3 March 2001) is a French professional footballer who plays as a central midfielder for Pau FC.

Career
He began his senior career with their reserves in 2018. On 2021, Bouchlarhem joined the reserve team of Ligue 1 side FC Lorient. In June 2022, Bouchlarhem departed from Lorient after only one season for Pau FC. He made his professional debut with Pau in a 3–0 Ligue 2 loss to his former club Chamois Niortais on 30 December 2022.

Personal life
Born in France, Bouchlarhem is of Moroccan descent.

References

External links
 

2001 births
Living people
Sportspeople from Charente-Maritime
French footballers
French sportspeople of Moroccan descent
Association football midfielders
Pau FC players
Ligue 2 players
Championnat National 3 players